Grazjyna Engelbrecht (born 26 April 1982) is a South African former field hockey player who competed in the 2004 Summer Olympics.

References

External links

1982 births
Living people
Afrikaner people
South African people of Dutch descent
South African female field hockey players
Female field hockey goalkeepers
Olympic field hockey players of South Africa
Field hockey players at the 2004 Summer Olympics
Competitors at the 2003 All-Africa Games
African Games competitors for South Africa